The Kunekune is a small breed of domestic pig from New Zealand. Kunekune are hairy with a rotund build, and may bear wattles hanging from their lower jaws. Their colour ranges from black and white, to ginger, cream, gold-tip, black, brown, and tricoloured. They have a docile, friendly nature, and can successfully be kept as pets.

History 
The breed is believed to have descended from an Asian domestic breed introduced to New Zealand in the early 19th century by whalers or traders. They differ markedly from the feral pig of European origin known in New Zealand as a "Captain Cooker". The native Māori people of New Zealand adopted Kunekune; kunekune is a Māori word meaning "fat and round".

By the 1980s, only an estimated 50 purebred Kunekune remained. Michael Willis and John Simister, wildlife park owners, started a breeding recovery programme, which encouraged other recovery efforts. , the breed no longer faces extinction, with breed societies in both New Zealand and the United Kingdom. In 1993, two were imported into the United States from the UK.

Behaviour 
In 2017, a report of Science Daily said the Kunekune has remarkable social learning with "astonishingly good memory".

Appearance 
The Kunekune is covered in hair which can be long or short, and straight or curly. Hair colours include black, brown, ginger, gold, cream, and spotted combinations. It has a medium to short, slightly upturned snout, often black, and either semilopped or pricked ears. It has a short, round body with short legs and may have two wattles (called piri piri) under its chin.

As pets 
Kunekune can be kept as pets in New Zealand and are a recognised breed of miniature pig.

Kunekune cannot be imported into Australia, as Australia does not allow the import of live pigs for biosecurity reasons. However, breeders have created an alternative Australian breed: the Australian miniature pig.

Kunekune can also be kept as pets in Austria, Belgium, Canada, Denmark, France, Germany, Ireland, the Netherlands, Portugal, Switzerland the United Kingdom and the United States.

References

External links 

 The British Kunekune Pig Society

Mammals of New Zealand
Pig breeds originating in New Zealand